Frank Mayo may refer to:
 Frank M. Mayo (1839–1896), American actor and comedian
 Frank Mayo (actor) (1889–1963), American silent screen actor
 Frank R. Mayo (1908–1987), SRI chemist who won the 1967 ACS Award in Polymer Chemistry for Mayo–Lewis equation